The unmanned reef lights of the Florida Keys were navigational aids erected near the Florida Keys between 1921 and 1935. They were intended to mark local hazards and did not need to be visible for as far as the reef lights that were erected near the Keys during the 19th century. By the time the lights in this list were erected, older lighthouses were being automated, and these new lights were designed to be automated from the start. The lights resembled the older reef lights in having a wrought iron skeletal pyramidal structure on a screw-pile foundation. They all originally had lanterns on their peaks, so that they looked like smaller versions of the older reef lights, but had no keeper's quarters.

The first two unmanned lights in the Florida Keys, the Molasses Reef Light and the Pacific Reef Light, were built as square pyramidal towers to the same plan in 1921. The Hen and Chickens Shoal Light was the smallest of these lights, and the only one built as a triangular pyramidal tower. It still exists, serving as a daymark. The lantern has been removed. A design for a standardized hexagonal pyramidal tower was developed in 1932 and used for the Smith Shoal and Tennessee Reef lights erected in 1933, and for the Cosgrove Shoal and Pulaski Shoal lights erected in 1935.

List of lights

Gallery
Two of the lights built to the 1932 design.

Notes

References

Lighthouses in Monroe County, Florida